Latvia competed at the 2000 Summer Olympics in Sydney, Australia. Latvia won their first summer Olympic gold medal at these games. 45 competitors, 30 men and 15 women, took part in 47 events in 13 sports.

Medalists

Athletics

Men
Track & road events

Field events

Women
Track & road events

Field events

Canoeing

Sprint
Men

Cycling

Road

Track
1000m time trial

Men's Sprint

Team sprint

Men's Keirin

Fencing

One female fencer represented Latvia in 2000.
Women

Gymnastics

Men

Judo

Men

Modern pentathlon

Rowing

Men

Sailing

Women

Shooting

Men

Swimming

Men

Women

Weightlifting

Men

Wrestling

Men's freestyle

Notes
Wallechinsky, David (2004). The Complete Book of the Summer Olympics (Athens 2004 Edition). Toronto, Canada. . 
International Olympic Committee (2001). The Results. Retrieved 12 November 2005.
Sydney Organising Committee for the Olympic Games (2001). Official Report of the XXVII Olympiad Volume 1: Preparing for the Games. Retrieved 20 November 2005.
Sydney Organising Committee for the Olympic Games (2001). Official Report of the XXVII Olympiad Volume 2: Celebrating the Games. Retrieved 20 November 2005.
Sydney Organising Committee for the Olympic Games (2001). The Results. Retrieved 20 November 2005.
International Olympic Committee Web Site

References

Nations at the 2000 Summer Olympics
2000 Summer Olympics
2000 in Latvian sport